NA-226 Thatta is a constituency for the National Assembly of Pakistan.

Members of Parliament

Since 2018: NA-232 Thatta

Election 2002 

General elections were held on 10 Oct 2002. Syed Ayaz Ali Shah Sheerazi of PML-Q won by 57,195 votes.

Election 2008 

General elections were held on 18 Feb 2008. Dr. Abdul Wahid Soomro of PPP won by  votes.

Election 2013 

General elections were held on 11 May 2013. Shamas-un-Nisa of PPP won and became the member of National Assembly.

Election 2018 

General elections were held on 25 July 2018.

See also
NA-225 Sujawal
NA-227 Jamshoro

References

External links 
Election result's official website

NA-237